Caning is used as a form of corporal punishment in Malaysia. It can be divided into at least four contexts: judicial/prison, school, domestic, and sharia/syariah. Of these, the first is largely a legacy of British colonial rule in the territories that are now part of Malaysia, particularly Malaya.

Judicial caning, the most severe of the four forms of corporal punishment in Malaysia, can be ordered as part of a criminal sentence imposed by civil courts on male convicts. Always ordered in addition to a prison sentence for adult offenders, it is inflicted with a long and thick rattan cane on the prisoner's bare buttocks in an enclosed area in the prison. Convicts who were not sentenced to caning earlier in a court of law may also be punished by caning in the same way if they commit aggravated offences while serving time in prison.

In schools, students may be caned with a light rattan cane on the buttocks over clothing or the palm of the hand for serious misconduct. Although legally only boys can be caned, the caning of girls is common in Malaysia. In the domestic setting, it is legally and culturally acceptable for parents to punish their children with a light rattan cane for misbehaviour. Sharia courts can sentence Muslim men and women (including Muslim foreigners) to caning for committing certain offences. This form of caning is much less severe compared to judicial caning and it is designed to humiliate the offender rather than to inflict physical pain.

Malaysia has been criticised by human rights groups for its use of judicial caning, which Amnesty International claims "subjects thousands of people each year to systematic torture and ill-treatment, leaving them with permanent physical and psychological scars".

Judicial caning

History
Caning, as a form of legally sanctioned corporal punishment for convicted criminals, was first introduced by the British Empire in the 19th century. It was formally codified under the Straits Settlements Penal Code Ordinance IV in 1871.

In that era, offences punishable by caning were similar to those punishable by birching or flogging (with the cat o' nine tails) in England and Wales. They included robbery, aggravated forms of theft, burglary, assault with the intention of sexual abuse, a second or subsequent conviction of rape, a second or subsequent offence relating to prostitution, and living on or trading in prostitution.

The practice of judicial caning was retained as a form of legal penalty after the Federation of Malaya declared independence from Britain in 1957. It is largely a legacy of British colonial rule and has nothing to do with "Islamic justice" even though the majority of the Malaysian population are Muslims.

Legal basis
Sections 286–291 of the Criminal Procedure Code lay down the procedures governing caning, which is referred to as "whipping" in the Code in accordance with traditional British legislative terminology. The procedures include the following:

The offender cannot be sentenced to more than 24 strokes of the cane in a single trial. In the case of a juvenile offender, the number of strokes is capped at 10.
In the case of a juvenile offender or a person sentenced to caning for committing relatively less serious offences (e.g. white-collar offences), the caning is inflicted in the way of school discipline using a light rattan cane.
Caning is not to be carried out by instalments. If an offender is sentenced to caning in two or more separate trials, the total number of strokes may be inflicted in a single session if it does not exceed 24.
A medical officer is required to be present and to certify that the offender is in a fit state of health to undergo the punishment.

Boys aged between 10 and 18 may be sentenced to a maximum of 10 strokes with a light rattan cane.

Exemptions
The following groups of people shall not be caned:

Women
Men above the age of 50, except those convicted of rape
Men sentenced to death

Offences punishable by caning 
Malaysian criminal law prescribes caning for a wide range of offences, always in addition to a prison term and never as a punishment by itself except for juvenile offenders in some cases. Caning is usually a routine punishment for serious offences, notably those involving rape, violence or drug trafficking, but also for lesser offences such as illegal immigration, bribery, and criminal breach of trust. Every year, thousands of illegal immigrants (mostly from Indonesia) are briefly incarcerated, punished with one or two strokes of the cane, and then deported. In November 2003, illegal moneylending was added to the list of offences punishable by caning.

Malaysians have called for caning to be imposed as a punishment for illegal bike racing, snatch theft, traffic offences, deserting one's wife, perpetrating get-rich-quick schemes, and vandalism (cf. Singapore's Vandalism Act). However, these offences still remain outside the list of offences punishable by caning.

Statistics 
Although the Malaysian government does not release overall figures of the number of offenders sentenced to caning every year, in 2010 Amnesty International used statistical sampling to estimate that as many as 10,000 prisoners were caned in a year.

In 2004, the Malaysian Deputy Home Affairs Minister stated that 18,607 undocumented migrants were caned in the first 16 months since caning for immigration offences started in August 2002. In 2009, the Malaysian parliament revealed 34,923 foreigners were caned between 2002 and 2008. Over 60 percent of them were Indonesians, 14 percent were Burmese, and 14 percent were Filipinos.

Caning officers
The criteria for the selection of caning officers are very stringent, with maybe only two out of every 30 applicants being chosen. Those selected undergo special training. They are trained to swing the cane at a speed of at least  and produce a force upon impact of at least . In 2005, they were paid 10 ringgit for each stroke as compared to three ringgit previously.

The cane

Two types of rattan canes are used for judicial caning:
 Thinner cane, used on white-collar criminals who committed offences such as bribery and criminal breach of trust.
 Thicker cane, used on offenders who committed serious and violent crimes, such as drug trafficking, causing grievous hurt, armed robbery and rape.

Administration procedure

For adult offenders

The punishment cannot be carried out until after seven days from the date when the offender was sentenced to caning. If the offender made an appeal to an appellate court, the sentence must be confirmed by the court before it can be carried out. The punishment cannot be carried out within 24 hours of the sentence being passed except by special order in case of emergency.

The offender is not told in advance when he will be caned; he is notified only on the day his sentence is to be carried out or, in some instances, one day before. The uncertainty often puts offenders through much fear and psychological suffering.

On the day, a medical officer inspects him and determines whether he is in a fit state of health to undergo the punishment. If the medical officer certifies that the offender is not in a fit state of health to be caned, the offender will be sent back to the court for the caning sentence to be remitted or converted to a prison term of up to 24 months, in addition to the original prison term he was sentenced to.

If the medical officer certifies the offender fit, the offender is then confined in a holding area with other prisoners who are going to be caned on the same day. The offender is escorted to the caning area when it is his turn to be punished. The caning is conducted in an open yard surrounded by walls in the prison, out of the view of the public and other prisoners. The prison director oversees the caning, along with the medical officer and other prison officers. He reads the terms of punishment to the offender and asks him to confirm the number of strokes.

While the prison staff present at the caning scene are usually all men, sometimes female doctors from government hospitals might be ordered to participate because it was part of their duties as government employees.

In practice, the offender is required to strip completely naked for the punishment. However, he may be given a loincloth or a sarong to cover his genitals.

After he confirms the number of strokes, he is taken to an A-shaped wooden frame, to which he is secured throughout the duration of the punishment. The front of his body rests against a padded cushion on the frame while his arms are tied above his head and his legs spread apart and secured tightly to the frame (see the mannequin in the adjacent picture). A "torso shield" is fastened around his body, exposing only his buttocks while protecting his lower back (the kidneys and lower spine area) and upper thighs (near the genitals) from any strokes that might land off-target. A prison officer stands in front of the offender and wraps his hands around the offender's head in case he jerks back his head and injures his neck. The caning is administered on the offender's bare buttocks. The caning officer stands beside the frame and delivers the number of strokes specified in the sentence at intervals of about 30 seconds. To ensure maximum effect, he ensures the tip of the cane comes in contact with the target area and drags it quickly along the skin to break it.

Sanitary procedures are observed as a precaution against HIV transmissions. Each cane is soaked in antiseptic before use to prevent infection. In the case of an HIV-positive subject, the cane used is burnt after the punishment is over. Caning officers also sometimes wear protective smocks, gloves and goggles.

For juvenile offenders
The Criminal Procedure Code stipulates that juvenile offenders (below the age of 18) sentenced to caning shall receive the punishment "in the way of school discipline using a light rattan cane." The legal limit for juveniles is 10 strokes. According to press reports from between 2012 and 2014, the punishment is administered by a police officer inside the courtroom in full view of everyone present there, immediately after the judge announced the sentence. The offender keeps his clothes on and receives the punishment on the buttocks over clothing while bending over a table. A medical officer is also present to supervise the punishment and ensure safety.

A lawyer who represented a juvenile offender who was sentenced to public caning in court defended the punishment by saying that it was part of a plea bargain with the prosecution to ensure that the offender would be punished "in the way of school discipline" instead of the manner in which adult offenders are caned in prison. She also added that such punishments are common in Malaysia and that she had witnessed six of such cases in her five years of legal practice. However, another lawyer pointed out there were errors in the way the sentence was ordered and carried out.

Medical treatment and the effects

A 2010 report by Amnesty International described the severity of judicial caning as follows, "In Malaysian prisons specially trained caning officers tear into victims' bodies with a metre-long cane swung with both hands at high speed. The cane rips into the victim's naked skin, pulps the fatty tissue below, and leaves scars that extend to muscle fibre. The pain is so severe that victims often lose consciousness."

As the caning officers are trained to strike the target and drag the tip of the cane across the wound, the laceration will cause the skin to come off immediately and thus draw blood. Due to the physical pain and intense fear, the offender may lose control over his urinary and bowel functions, or even lose consciousness altogether. Offenders have variously described the pain as "intense", "burning", "being bitten by red ants", "like an electric shock", "worst pain in my life", etc. In any case, judicial caning usually leaves permanent scars on the offender's buttocks.

After the caning, the offender is released from the frame and taken to the prison clinic for medical treatment.

Malaysian caning videos
In August 1991, Malaysia's TV3 broadcast a two-part documentary on prison life shot by Majalah Tiga at Kajang Prison and Pudu Prison with permission from the Malaysian Prison Department. The second part focused on corporal and capital punishment. Wan Zaleha Radzi, the documentary's anchorperson, said that her team filmed an actual caning scene. However, direct camera shots of the cane striking prisoners' bare buttocks were edited out from the telecast because they were deemed too sensitive for viewers.

In the mid 2000s, the Malaysian government released three graphic videos featuring several genuine judicial canings, ranging from one stroke to 20 strokes. The canings were filmed in Seremban Prison near the national capital, Kuala Lumpur.

Comparison of judicial caning in Brunei, Malaysia and Singapore

Judicial caning is also used as a form of legal punishment for criminal offences in two of Malaysia's neighbouring countries, Brunei and Singapore. There are some differences across the three countries.

Prison caning
Under Malaysian law, the officer in charge of a prison (holding the rank of Assistant Commissioner of Prison and above) may impose caning on prisoners who commit aggravated prison offences even if they were not sentenced to caning earlier in a court of law. The prisoner is given an opportunity to hear the charge and evidence against him and make his defence.

Sharia caning
Malaysia has a parallel justice system of sharia courts, which can order caning for Muslim men and women under Section 125 of the Syariah Criminal Offences (Federal Territories) Act 1997.

This kind of caning is rarely implemented, and is quite different from, and much less severe than, judicial caning under Malaysian criminal law. It is intended to be shaming rather than particularly painful. Before the caning is carried out, a medical officer must certify that the offender is fit to undergo the punishment. The punishment is normally carried out in an enclosed area out of the view of the public, even though the Syariah Criminal Procedure (Sabah) Enactment 1993 allows the court to determine where the caning is to take place. The offender remains fully dressed; men remain standing when they receive the punishment while women are seated. Although the law states that the offender can be caned on all parts of the body except the face, head, stomach, chest or private parts, in practice the caning is usually administered on the offender's back. It is carried out by an officer of the same sex as the offender. Each stroke intended to be executed with force low enough to not break the skin, and the officer delivers the punishment with a "limp wrist" and without raising his/her hand. A medical officer is also present throughout the procedure to ensure safety.

This form of caning is also practised in Indonesia's Aceh Province, where it is more common.

Notable cases
 There was controversy surrounding the caning sentence for Kartika Sari Dewi Shukarno, a Malaysian hospital worker working in Singapore. She was sentenced in 2009 by a sharia court to six strokes of the cane and a fine for drinking beer in a hotel bar. Some said that Kartika's sentence did not conform to Islamic law, but Mohamad Sahfri, the chairman of the Pahang Religious Affairs Committee, said that all relevant regulations had been observed. On 1 April 2010, one day before the sentence was due to be carried out, the Sultan of Pahang commuted the sentence to three weeks of community service. Kartika said she preferred to have the original sentence imposed.
 On 9 February 2010, three Muslim women were caned by order of a sharia court for adultery, the first time women were caned in Malaysia. The advocacy group Sisters in Islam and the Malaysian Bar Council said that these canings violated federal civil laws prohibiting the punishment against women.
 On 3 September 2018, two Malaysian women were each sentenced to six strokes of the cane and a fine for having lesbian sex. The punishment was carried out at the Sharia High Court in Kuala Terengganu. The case sparked widespread controversy and drew strong criticism from various rights groups in Malaysia.

School caning
In Malaysian primary and secondary schools, caning is a legal disciplinary measure. Although permitted for boys only, in practice it is sometimes also used on girls. 

A survey conducted by YouGov in 2019 found that 81 percent of parents in Malaysia supported the use of corporal punishment. 47 percent supported its use in schools. The survey also found that 85 percent of the parents had been physically disciplined growing up.

Government guidelines on school caning 

The Education Ministry discourages the caning of primary school students. However, based on numerous reported cases, caning is still common in both primary and secondary schools.

Public caning has been discouraged in schools after the Education Regulations came into force. However, there are many cases suggesting that the caning of both boys and girls in front of the class/school is common.

There are many reported cases suggesting that the caning of girls on the clothed bottom, arms, legs, or palm of the hand is a common practice. Anecdotal evidence suggests that, especially in Chinese-medium schools, every girl would undoubtedly be caned at least once or more.

While serious infringements such as theft, smoking, gangsterism and bullying are among offences punishable by caning, minor transgressions are also frequently dealt with by physical punishment.

Chinese-language medium schools 
Caning is especially prevalent Malaysia's Chinese-language medium schools, where it is a daily occurrence for girls and boys of all ages instead of being a "special punishment" reserved for serious offences. Typically, a student is caned on the spot in front of his or her class/school for transgressions such as:

 late-coming
 skipping class
 improperly attired, having long hair (boys), nails not trimmed
 defiance / disobedience, not paying attention in class
 being unable to answer questions correctly
 not bringing textbooks/homework to school
 incomplete/poorly done homework
 poor results

This will typically be administered on the palm of the hand or clothed bottom, albeit less serious or forceful than an "official" caning for serious disciplinary breaches. Anecdotally, these will cause the palm/buttocks to sting, especially after multiple consecutive strokes. Mass punishments are not uncommon.

As a result, it is common for a student to receive 30 to a few hundred strokes of the cane a day for various offences.

Notable cases 
 2000: A 10-year-old student from a Klang school was given 35 strokes of the cane on both hands by her teacher for late homework.
2009: A class of 43 nine-year-old boys and girls in a Kuala Lumpur primary school were each made to turn around and given multiple strokes of the cane by their substitute teacher for making excessive noise, leaving welts on their backs and breaking the canes. 
2010: Two 16-year-old girls from Pahang were given one to two strokes of the cane by the vice-principal on their palms and arms for leaving their classroom without a "hall pass".
2011: 2 girls and 11 boys of various ages from a Muar secondary school were caned on their bottoms for reasons including rudeness to teacher, participating in a quarrel, and handing in blank exam papers.
2013: A class of 41 ten-year-old students from a Kuching school were caned by the principal on their palms for making excessive noise. 
2015: Forty 13-year-old girls from a Selangor religious school were each caned twice behind their body and once on the palm of their hands after none of them admitted to stealing RM100 from a fellow student.
2015: A student from a Sarawak secondary school was caned on her palm after being absent while unwell without a sick note.
2015: 12-year-old students from a class in a Negeri Sembilan primary school were each caned more than 10 times, a stroke of the cane for getting each practice question wrong or not bringing textbooks, during a holiday class. A particular student that had been given 20 strokes insulted her teacher on social media afterwards. This resulted in the vice-principal giving her additional strokes of the cane in front of her class as well as detention.
2015: A 9-year-old student from a Senai school was caned twice on her palm and thrice on her bottom in front of her class, using a bundle of 3 canes, for not seeking permission before drinking water. She had already been given more than 10 strokes of the cane on another occasion for not answering a question that her teacher asked.
2016: A 7-year-old student from Johor Bahru was caned by her teacher for not getting full marks on a test and not doing homework, leaving 7 welts on her arms and legs. Parents questioned the teacher as it was not the first time caning her.
2016: An 11-year-old student was caned all over her body in front of her class and given detention by her teacher for not completing homework, leaving multiple welts on her thighs, arms and body.
2016: A religious teacher caned three boys who tried to run away from their school's hostel.
2017: 8 and 9 year old students from a Selangor school were given up to 12 strokes of the cane for not submitting school fees.
2017: A nine-year-old student from Johor Bahru was caned on her palms and more than six strokes on her arms afterwards for repeated truancy, disobedience, not submitting her homework and not bringing textbooks.
2018: An 8-year-old student was given nine strokes of the cane on her palms for spilling water on exercise books.
 2019: A 13-year-old student from a Johor Bahru secondary school was caned in front of her class for calling her teacher derogatory names, leaving more than six red welts on her arms and legs.
2019: An 11-year-old student and more than half of her class from a Puchong school were each given one stroke of the cane on their palms and given lines for not doing or bringing their homework.

Domestic caning
Corporal punishment of children with a rattan cane by their parents is lawful and culturally accepted in Malaysia. This is done for various reasons, including misbehaviour, laziness or poor results. Sometimes, parents may cane their children after learning that they had been caned in school. However, when the act of caning causes physical and mental injuries, it becomes an offence under the law.

Criticism
Malaysia has been criticised by human rights groups for its use of judicial caning. A 2010 report by Amnesty International criticises the increasing use of judicial caning in Malaysia and claims the punishment "subjects thousands of people each year to systematic torture and ill-treatment, leaving them with permanent physical and psychological scars". Amnesty International estimates that some 10,000 people are caned each year, many of them for immigration offences. The charity argues the practice could cause long-term disabilities and trauma and said many of the foreigners sentenced to caning did not get legal representation or understand the charge.

Malaysian officials reject the accusation of torture. The Prison Department states that canings are carefully supervised by prison authorities and attended by medical doctors.

See also 
 Caning
 Caning in Singapore
 Caning in Brunei
 Judicial corporal punishment
 Human rights in Malaysia

References

External links
 "Malaysia caning case sparks debate", Al Jazeera, Qatar, 23 August 2009. Includes video with interview with Kartika.
  "Hukuman Sebat Rotan Dari Segi Perundangan Dan Pelaksanaan". (English: "Caning from an Administrative and Procedural Viewpoint") Prisons Department of Malaysia. Retrieved 13 June 2008.

Corporal punishments
Violence in Malaysia
Penal system in Malaysia
Whipping